The following highways are numbered 430:

Canada
Manitoba Provincial Road 430
 New Brunswick Route 430
Newfoundland and Labrador Route 430
Quebec Autoroute 430 (former)

Japan
 Route 430 (Japan)

United States
  Interstate 430
  U.S. Route 430 (former)
  Florida State Road 430
  Maryland Route 430
  Nevada State Route 430
  New York State Route 430
  Ohio State Route 430
  Pennsylvania Route 430
  Puerto Rico Highway 430
  South Carolina Highway 430
  Wyoming Highway 430